La Nación is a conservative daily newspaper published in Paraguay.

Founded on May 25, 1995, by the businessman and sports director Osvaldo Domínguez Dibb, in the city of Fernando de la Mora.

Together with Diario Crónica and the broadcasting stations Montecarlo FM 100.9 and 970 AM it is part of Grupo Nación de Comunicaciones.

The NGO Survival awarded it the prize for "The most racist article" of the year 2007, for calling Indians "Neolithic" and comparing them to "a cancer".

On April 15, 2015, the businesswoman Sarah Cartes formalized yesterday the acquisition of the Nation Group Communications, which became part of the Cartes Group

For 15 years, the Communication Nation Group was led by the businessman and sports director Alejandro Dominguez, son of Osvaldo Dominguez Dibb; who in January 2016 was chosen as president of the Conmebol.

In August 2015, the Nación de Comunicaciones Group bought the Popular newspaper, in addition to the web site hoy.com.py and a radio that is transmitted over the internet, all belonging to the Multimedia group, of former President Juan Carlos Wasmosy.

References

External links
 La Nación
 Crónica
 Radio Montecarlo FM
 Radio 970 AM
 Grupo Cartes

Newspapers published in Paraguay
Spanish-language newspapers
Publications established in 1995
1995 establishments in Paraguay